Miss Universe Puerto Rico 2017 was the 62nd Miss Universe Puerto Rico pageant. Brenda Jiménez of Aguadilla crowned Danna Hernández of San Juan at the end of the event. Hernández represented Puerto Rico at the Miss Universe 2017 pageant. 40 contestants competed in this year's pageant, same as last year.

Results

Placements

Special Awards

Contestants
 Adjuntas – Cristal Molina
 Aguadilla – Tayra Soto
 Aibonito – Gretchen Colon Morales
 Añasco – Mariam Saffar
 Arroyo – Niomi Cora
 Barranquitas – Pamela Rivera
 Bayamón – Von Marie Santiago
 Cabo Rojo – Stephanie Font
 Caguas – Nicole Marie Colon Rivera
 Carolina - Tanya Marie Romero
 Cayey – Patricia Lespier
 Coamo – Michelle Rivera
 Corozal – Chris Navarro
 Dorado – Kímberly Jiménez
 Fajardo – Génesis Concepción
 Florida – Rashelle Miranda
 Guánica - Lilliriel Rivera
 Guayama – Natcha Romero
 Guaynabo – Karla Victoria Aponte
 Hatillo – Zudelys Lago
 Humacao – Sabrina Brito
 Isabela – Francheska Fuentes
 Jayuya – Gabriela Pérez
 Juana Díaz – Shakira Maldonado
 Lajas – Nidlla Mercado
 Las Piedras – Angélica Rodríguez
 Mayagüez – Cristal Olavarría
 Naranjito – Michelle Torres
 Orocovis – Nishayra Santiago
 Patillas – Charlene Ortiz
 Peñuelas – Layla Velázquez
 Ponce – Kimberly Marie Jimenez
 Rincón – Sara Rivera
 Río Grande – Ivana Carolina Irizarry Fritany
 Salinas – Natalie Soto
 San Germán – Camille Alexandra Acosta Ortiz
 San Juan – Danna Hernández
 Santa Isabel – Elijah Rodríguez
 Utuado – Beverly Marie Rodriguez De Leon
 Villalba – Kathleen Torres

See also

Miss Universe Puerto Rico

Puerto Rico 2017
Universe Puerto Rico